Yoon Soo-Kyung (born January 19, 1964), also spelled as Yun Su-Gyeong, is a South Korean team handball player and Olympic medalist. She played with the South Korean team at the 1984 Summer Olympics in Los Angeles, where the team received a silver medal.

References

External links

1964 births
Living people
South Korean female handball players
Olympic handball players of South Korea
Handball players at the 1984 Summer Olympics
Olympic silver medalists for South Korea
Olympic medalists in handball
Medalists at the 1984 Summer Olympics
20th-century South Korean women